Zigadenus is a genus of flowering plants now containing only one species, Zigadenus glaberrimus, the sandbog death camas, found in the southeastern United States from Mississippi to Virginia. Around 20 species were formerly included in the genus, but have now been moved to other genera.

Description 
A total of 30–70 flowers are borne in panicles. The tepals of the flower remain attached to the fruit capsule when it forms.

Zigadenus glaberrimus flowers from mid July to September. It is found growing in pine bogs, savannas and sandy pinelands in the US states of Alabama, Florida, Georgia, Mississippi, Virginia, North Carolina and South Carolina.

Systematics
The genus is a member of the family Melanthiaceae, tribe Melanthieae. Molecular phylogenetic studies in the 21st century have resulted in number of changes to placements within this tribe. (See also Phylogeny of Melanthieae.)

Species formerly placed in Zigadenus
Around twenty species were included in the genus as it was previously circumscribed. Zigadenus glaberrimus, sandbog deathcamas, is the only species remaining in the genus. Species which have been transferred to other genera are listed below.

Amianthium muscitotoxum – flypoison
Anticlea elegans – elegant camas, alkali grass, mountain deathcamas
Anticlea hintoniorum
Anticlea mogollonensis – Mogollon deathcamas
Anticlea neglecta
Anticlea sibirica
Anticlea vaginata – sheathed deathcamas
Anticlea virescens – green deathcamas
Anticlea volcanica – lava deathcamas
Stenanthium densum – Osceola's plume, black snakeroot, crow poison
Stenanthium gramineum – featherbells
Stenanthium leimanthoides – pinebarren deathcamas  
Toxicoscordion brevibracteatum – desert deathcamas
Toxicoscordion exaltatum – giant deathcamas
Toxicoscordion fontanum – smallflower deathcamas
Toxicoscordion fremontii – Fremont's deathcamas, star zigadene – (several varieties)
Toxicoscordion nuttallii – Nuttall's deathcamas
Toxicoscordion paniculatum – foothill deathcamas, sand-corn
Toxicoscordion venenosum – deathcamas, meadow deathcamas – (several varieties)
Toxicoscordion micranthum – smallflower deathcamas

Toxicity 
Like all the species previously included in this genus, all parts of Z. glaberrimus are toxic, due to the presence of alkaloids such as zygacine. Grazing animals, such as sheep and cattle, may be affected and this or related species have caused human fatalities.

References 

Melanthiaceae
Monotypic Liliales genera
Flora of the Southeastern United States